CMU most commonly refers to: 

Carnegie Mellon University, a university in Pittsburgh, Pennsylvania, United States

CMU may also refer to:

Higher education 

California Miramar University in San Diego, California, United States
Cambodian Mekong University in Phnom Penh, Cambodia
Canadian Mennonite University in Winnipeg, Manitoba, Canada
Capital Medical University in Beijing, China
Cardiff Metropolitan University in Cardiff, Wales, United Kingdom
Caribbean Medical University in Curaçao, Netherlands Antilles
Central Methodist University in Fayette, Missouri, United States
Central Michigan University in Mount Pleasant, Michigan, United States
Central Mindanao University in Maramag, Bukidnon, Philippines
Chiang Mai University in Chiangmai, Thailand
China Medical University (Liaoning) in Shenyang, Liaoning, China
China Medical University (Taiwan) in Taichung, Taiwan
Colorado Mesa University in Grand Junction, Colorado, United States

Other uses 

 Charge Maximale d'Utilisation, i.e. Safe Working Load (SWL) or Working Load Limit (WLL), the maximum load which may be applied to a given product or component
 Coffman Memorial Union, the student activity center at the University of Minnesota
 Couverture maladie universelle, a French public health program
 Complete Music Update (aka College Music Update) a music business news service
 Communications Management Unit, a portion of a US federal prison facility that restricts an inmate's access to other inmates and ability to communicate with the outside world
 Concrete masonry unit, a concrete "block" used in construction
 Capacity Market Unit, a term used in an Electricity market